Hippeutis complanatus, or the flat ram's-horn snail, is a species of minute air-breathing freshwater snail, an aquatic pulmonate gastropod mollusk or micromollusk in the family Planorbidae, the ram's horn snails.

Hippeutis complanatus is the type species of the genus Hippeutis.

Distribution
The species is found in the Palearctic zone, including Europe.

 Latvia
 Czech Republic - least concern (LC)
 Slovakia
 Poland
 Germany
 Austria
 Netherlands
 Sweden
 British Isles: Great Britain, Ireland

Shell description
This minute shell is almost perfectly planispiral and shaped like a lens. The whorls overlap one another. The shell color varies from offwhite to a brownish yellow.

Ecology
This snail lives in ponds and ditches, and prefers calcium-rich waters.

References

External links
 Hippeutis complanatus at Animalbase taxonomy,short description, distribution, biology,status (threats), images 
Hippeutis images at  Consortium for the Barcode of Life 

Planorbidae
Palearctic molluscs
Gastropods described in 1758
Taxa named by Carl Linnaeus